Body Head Bangerz: Volume One is the debut studio album by American southern hip hop group Body Head Bangerz. The original version of the album released on August 3, 2004 under Body Head Entertainment, but was re-released on October 26, 2004 by Universal Music with a modified album cover, a re-ordered track list with two new songs, "Can't Let Go" and "Getting Money Right" but excluding the song "Down Here". The clean version of the re-release contains the same, though non-explicit, tracks as the original release. The album features many southern hip hop or "Dirty South" musicians such as B.G., Lil' Flip, Petey Pablo, Mike Jones and Bun B among others.  The album produced two singles, "I Smoke, I Drank" and "Can't Be Touched". Both singles were featured on BET and one single appeared on the Billboard Hot 100 list. The song "Body Head Anthem" was featured on the in-game soundtrack for Midnight Club 3: DUB Edition.

Track listing 
 Body Head Bangerz: Volume One

Chart positions

References 

2004 debut albums
Hip hop albums by American artists